Bethel Church and Graveyard, also known as Bethel Community Church, is a historic church and cemetery in Logan Township, Fountain County, Indiana. The church was built in 1850 and is a one-story, simple Greek Revival-style timber-frame building. It measures . It has a medium-pitched gable roof and sits on a sandstone block foundation coated in stucco. The congregation has been meeting on this site since 1825. The first marked burial in the adjacent cemetery dates to 1825.

It was listed on the National Register of Historic Places in 1995.

References

External links
 

Churches on the National Register of Historic Places in Indiana
Greek Revival church buildings in Indiana
Churches completed in 1850
1825 establishments in Indiana
Buildings and structures in Fountain County, Indiana
National Register of Historic Places in Fountain County, Indiana
Cemeteries on the National Register of Historic Places in Indiana